The Soul Is Willing is a studio album by organist Shirley Scott recorded and released in 1963 for Prestige as PRLP 7267. It features famous saxophonist Stanley Turrentine. In 1995, the album was reissued along with Soul Shoutin' on the same CD, featuring a different track order.

Reception
The Allmusic review stated "This is a good album that shows the husband and wife team of Shirley Scott and Stanley Turrentine in their usual, excellent form -- a fine example of organ combo soul jazz".

Track listing 
"I Feel All Right" (Stanley Turrentine) - 6:20
"Secret Love" (Sammy Fain, Paul Francis Webster) - 8:23
"Remember" (Irving Berlin) - 4:12
"Stolen Sweets" (Wild Bill Davis, Dickie Thompson) - 6:26
"The Soul Is Willing" (Turrentine) - 6:32
"Yes Indeed" (Sy Oliver) - 6:01

Personnel 
 Shirley Scott - organ
 Stanley Turrentine - tenor saxophone
 Major Holley - bass
 Grassella Oliphant - drums

References 

1963 albums
Albums recorded at Van Gelder Studio
Albums produced by Ozzie Cadena
Prestige Records albums
Shirley Scott albums